Sousse Airfield is an abandoned World War II military airfield in Tunisia, which was located in the vicinity of Sousse.   It was a temporary airfield used by the United States Army Air Forces Twelfth Air Force 31st Fighter Group which flew two squadrons of Supermarine Spitfires from the field between 9–19 June 1943

When the Americans pulled out the airfield was abandoned.   There is no evidence left of its existence in aerial photography of the area.

References

 Maurer, Maurer. Air Force Combat Units of World War II. Maxwell AFB, Alabama: Office of Air Force History, 1983. .

External links

Airfields of the United States Army Air Forces in Tunisia
Airports established in 1943